Telekhany is an urban settlement in Ivatsevichy Raion of the Brest Region in Belarus. Name spelling variants: : Celjahany,Tsseljahany, sometimes Tselyakhani, Celjachani; ; : Telekhany, Telehany, : Telekhan, Telechan, Telechon; other: Telekhani, Telekani.

Telekhany has about 4,500 inhabitants.

It is situated in the Polesia region by the Oginski Canal.

History

During World War II, the Jewish community was massacred by a cavalry detachment of SS in August 1941, according to the memoirs of Bogdan Mielnik, a Polish resident of Telekhany.

Notable residents
George Koval an American, a Soviet spy infiltrating the Manhattan Project

Notes

External links 
 Photos on Globus.tut.by (text in Russian)
 Photos on Radzima.org
 Documents about Jewish inhabitants of Telekhany (mostly English)
 Genealogy of the Ajzenberg/Eisenberg/Eizenberg family of Telechan
 "HOW DO YOU GET TO TELECHAN?" - an article by Arthur Eisenberg on his April 2001 Trip to Telechan
 Section of book on Telechan from AJZENBERGS OF TELECHAN by Arthur Eisenberg

Populated places in Brest Region
Urban-type settlements in Belarus
Brest Litovsk Voivodeship
Pinsky Uyezd
Polesie Voivodeship
Shtetls
Jewish Belarusian history
Holocaust locations in Belarus